Sean Hankin (born 28 February 1981) is an English former professional footballer who played as a defender in the Football League for Crystal Palace and Torquay United.

Life and career
Hankin was born in 1981 in Camberley, Surrey. He began his career as an apprentice at Crystal Palace, turning professional in June 1999. He made his league debut on 7 March 2000, coming on as a substitute for the injured Simon Rodger in the goalless draw with Bolton Wanderers at Selhurst Park, and agreed a new contract with Crystal Palace in June 2001.

Having made no more first-team appearances, Hankin joined Torquay United on loan in October 2001, as a replacement for fellow Palace player David Woozley who was returning to Selhurst Park at the end of his loan spell. He made his Torquay debut in the Football League Trophy against Bristol City and was sent off on his league debut in the 2–0 defeat away to Mansfield Town on 23 October. In December, he joined Torquay on a permanent deal for a £20,000 fee. Initially a regular in the Torquay side, Hankin lost his place in the team due to injury, was given only a short-term contract, and left in September 2003.

After brief spells with Hornchurch of the Isthmian League and Conference clubs Margate and Northwich Victoria, as well as training with Woking, Hankin settled at Crawley Town, helping them win the 2003–04 Southern League title and playing regularly in their first season in the Conference. He was released at the end of that season, and spent short spells with Lewes, for which he never played a Conference South match, and St Albans City, for which he played five times before being released at the end of November.

Hankin then signed for Llanelli, but moved on almost immediately to Farnborough Town. He was a regular in their side for the remainder of the season and the whole of 2006–07, making 50 appearances in all competitions. The club then went into liquidation, reformed two divisions lower, and Hankin left to join rivals Basingstoke Town. During the last of his four seasons with Basingstoke, he spent time with Fleet Town on a dual registration, before playing for clubs including A.F.C. Totton and Badshot Lea.

References 

1981 births
Living people
People from Camberley
English footballers
Crystal Palace F.C. players
Torquay United F.C. players
Hornchurch F.C. players
Margate F.C. players
Northwich Victoria F.C. players
Crawley Town F.C. players
Lewes F.C. players
St Albans City F.C. players
Farnborough F.C. players
Basingstoke Town F.C. players
Fleet Town F.C. players
A.F.C. Totton players
Badshot Lea F.C. players
English Football League players
Isthmian League players
National League (English football) players
Southern Football League players
Association football defenders